Debris is the debut album by electro-industrial project Ayria. It was released in 2003, along with a deluxe edition featuring a bonus disc and alternate packaging.

Track listing

 "DOS" - 4:37
 "Horrible Dream" - 5:39
 "Had Something" - 5:01
 "Mercury" - 5:56
 "The Radio" - 5:58
 "Red Shift" - 5:28
 "Sapphire" - 6:15
 "Disease" - 5:30
 "Start Again" - 6:07
 "Debris" - 5:06
 "Substance" - 4:04
 "Beta Complex" - 6:08
 "Kiss Me Goodnight as I'm Falling Asleep" - 4:08

Bonus Disc

 "Disease (Armageddon Dildos Mix)"
 "Horrible Dream (Pzycho Bitch Mix)"
 "Substance ("More Pills" XP8 Mix)"
 "Mercury ("Mercury Rising" V01d Mix)"
 "Horrible Dream ("Nightmare" Accessory Mix)"
 "Had Something ("Snow Lake" Interface Mix)"
 "Disease ("Tractor Factor" Boole Mix)"
 "Horrible Dream (Glis Mix)"
 "Sapphire (Implant Mix)"
 "Scattered Debris (Slipshod Mix)"
 "Disease (NamNamBulu mix)"
 "Horrible Dream (XPQ-21 mix)"
 "Disease (EchoRausch Mix)"

2003 albums
Ayria albums